Balloon Factory may refer to:

 School of Ballooning, a late 19th-century / early 20th-century British military unit
 The Balloon Factory, a 2006 album by British Electropop band Chikinki